Qianhuang may refer to the following towns in China:

Qianhuang, Fujian, in Quanzhou, Fujian
Qianhuang, Jiangsu, in Changzhou, Jiangsu